Vidyadhara(s) (Sanskrit , literally "wisdom-holders") are a group of supernatural beings in Indian religions who possess magical powers. In Hinduism, they also attend Shiva, who lives in the Himalayas. They are considered Upadevas, or demi-gods.

In Hinduism

In Hindu epics 
In the Hindu epics, Vidyādharas are described as essentially spirits of the air. They are described as doing different activities in the epics like gazing at human prowess with astonishment, strewing flowers watching a combat, rejoicing with music and laughter, crowned with wreaths and fleeing with their wives from danger. They possess great magical powers like the ability to diminish their size. They are endowed with epithets describing them as "doers of good and devoted to joy". They also live in Gandhamandhana mountain and other Himalayan mountains with Kinnaras. They are also described residing on Mount Krauncha, on Citrakuta where Rama saw Vidyadhara women playing, in the hills of Malabar and in the Khandava forest. They are also seen in Kubera's court, headed by their leader Chakradharman and in Indra's palace under Vipracitti.  A third leader of the Vidyadharas is described to the wise Jambavan. In the epic Mahabharata, Vidyadharas are described as following Indra with other semi-divine beings to the serpent-sacrifice of Janamejaya. In the epics, the women of the Vidyadharas, called Vidyadharis are described to possess great beauty, and were victims of kidnapping by demons like Ravana. In the Ramayana, Sundarkanda Verses 1.22 to 1.26 describe the plight of Vidyadharas and their women following the pressure exerted on Mount Mahendra by Hanuman while taking his position in his attempt to leapcross the ocean.

In Puranas and other texts 

In Agni Purana, they are described as wearing garlands in the sky and mentioned with other semi-divine beings like Yakshas and Gandharvas.

In the Bhagavata Purana, Citraketu is described as the king of Vidyadharas. It also tells about a cursed Vidyadhara called Sudarshana. In various references in the Purana, they are coupled with other semi-divine beings, who pray to the god Vishnu for help or enumerated among the many creations of God. The Vidyadhras with siddhas are said to have milked Mother Earth (Prithvi), who had assumed the form of a cow, by using the sage Kapila as the calf and collected different yogic mystic powers (siddhis) and the art of flying as milk in the pot of the sky.

Gunadhya is said to have composed seven massive stories about Vidyadharas, then to have destroyed the first six stories when the king rejected them, retaining only the seventh story — of Naravahanadatta — which became the Brihatkatha written in Paishachi language. This work is not extant, but three adaptations exist in Sanskrit: Brhatkathamanjari by Kshemendra, Kathasaritsagara by Somadeva, and Bṛhatkathāślokasaṃgraha by Budhasvamin. The Kathasaritsagara presents some stories about Vidyadharas like Devadatta (a Brahmin boy who acquired Vidyadhara-hood), Jimutavahana, Muktaphalaketu  and  Naravahanadatta (who became an emperor of the Vidyadharas).

In Jainism 
Jain legends describe Vidyadharas as advanced human beings or Aakashagochari human beings. According to Jainism, Vidyadharas are human beings but they have vidyas. Vidyadhara possess mystical powers and abilities in Jainism like flying. Vanara and Rakshasa are two of the many Vidyadhara clans according to Jain literature. Some of the Kings were Ravana, Hanuman and Vali.

See also
Rishi
Sennin
Weizza
Xian

References

Non-human races in Hindu mythology
Buddhist mystics